This is a list of people executed on Norfolk Island. It lists people who were executed by British (and from 1901, Australian) authorities within the modern-day boundaries of Norfolk Island. For people executed in other parts of Australia, see the sidebar.

Norfolk Island served as a penal colony 1788-1814, and again 1824-1856. It was mostly during this second period that people were executed on the island, including 12 on the same day for their involvement in the Cooking Pot Uprising.

1800s

 Peter McLean – 14 December 1800 – Irish convict and political prisoner, hanged without trial for conspiracy to mutiny.
 John Houlahan – 14 December 1800 – Irish convict and political prisoner, hanged without trial for conspiracy to mutiny.

1830s

 John McDonald - 13 April 1832 - Hanged for the attempted murder of fellow-convict Thomas Smith.
 Thomas Reilly (or Riley) - 23 September 1833 - Hanged for the murder of fellow-convict Edward Doolan.
 Matthew Connor - 23 September 1833 - Hanged for the attempted murder of constable Patrick Sullivan.
 James Reynolds - 23 September 1833 - Hanged for the attempted murder of constable Patrick Sullivan.
 Robert Douglas - 23 September 1834 - Hanged for mutiny.
 Henry Drummond - 23 September 1834 - Hanged for mutiny.
 James Bell - 23 September 1834 - Hanged for mutiny.
 Joseph Butler - 23 September 1834 - Hanged for mutiny.
 Robert Glennie - 23 September 1834 - Hanged for mutiny.
 Walter Burke - 23 September 1834 - Hanged for mutiny.
 Joseph Snell - 23 September 1834 - Hanged for mutiny.
 William McCulloch - 23 September 1834 - Hanged for mutiny.
 Michael Andrews - 23 September 1834 - Hanged for mutiny.
 William Groves - 23 September 1834 - Hanged for mutiny.
 Thomas Freshwater - 23 September 1834 - Hanged for mutiny.
 Henry Knowles - 23 September 1834 - Hanged for mutiny.
 Robert Ryan - 23 September 1834 - Hanged for mutiny.
 James Burrows - 26 December 1835 - Hanged for the murder of fellow-convict John Dursley.
 George Thompson - 26 December 1835 - Hanged for the attempted murder of fellow-convict John Fell at Longridge.

1840s

James Cairns – 13 October 1846 - Hanged for his involvement in the 'Cooking Pot Uprising'.
Owen Commuskey – 13 October 1846 - Hanged for his involvement in the 'Cooking Pot Uprising'.
John Davies (or Davis) – 13 October 1846 - Hanged for his involvement in the 'Cooking Pot Uprising'.
Lawrence Kavenagh – 13 October 1846 - Hanged for his involvement in the 'Cooking Pot Uprising'.
Samuel Kenyon – 13 October 1846 - Hanged for his involvement in the 'Cooking Pot Uprising'. 
Edward McGinniss – 13 October 1846 - Hanged for his involvement in the 'Cooking Pot Uprising'.
William Pearson – 13 October 1846 - Hanged for his involvement in the 'Cooking Pot Uprising'.
Dennis Pendergast – 13 October 1846 - Hanged for his involvement in the 'Cooking Pot Uprising'.
William Pickthorne – 13 October 1846 - Hanged for his involvement in the 'Cooking Pot Uprising'.
William Scrimshaw – 13 October 1846 - Hanged for his involvement in the 'Cooking Pot Uprising'.
William Westwood ('Jackey Jackey') - 13 October 1846 - Hanged for mutiny and the murder of convict constables John Morris, John Dinon, Thomas Saxton and police runner Stephen Smith, on 1 July 1846, known as the 'Cooking Pot Uprising'.
Henry Whiting – 13 October 1846 - Hanged for his involvement in the 'Cooking Pot Uprising'.
William Brown ('Doggie') - 19 October 1846 - Hanged for his involvement in the 'Cooking Pot Uprising'.
John Liddall - 3 November 1846 - Hanged for murder of Henry Clarke.
Bernard Macartney - 3 November 1846 - Hanged for murder of Henry Clarke.

References

Further reading 
 Heaton, J.H. Australian Dictionary of Dates and Men of the Time, S.W. Silver & Son, London, 1879. Part 2, pages 90–94.

Australian crime-related lists
Executed
Australia
 
Executions
Executions